Wolfwatching is a book of poems by former English Poet Laureate Ted Hughes, his fourteenth. It was first published in London by Faber and Faber in 1989.

Its dedication reads "For Hilda", and it contains twenty-one poems:

 "A Sparrow Hawk"
 "Two Astrological Conundrums"
 The Fool's Evil Dream
 Tell
 "Slump Sundays"
 "Climbing into Heptonstall"
 "A Macaw"
 "Dust As We Are"
 "Wolfwatching"
 "Telegraph Wires"
 "Source"
 "Sacrifice"
 "For the Duration"
 "Anthem for Doomed Youth"
 "The Black Rhino"
 "Leaf Mould"
 "Manchester Skytrain"
 "Walt"
 Under High Wood
 The Atlantic
 "Take What You Want But Pay For It"
 "Us He Devours"
 "Little Whale Song"
 "On the Reservations"
 Sitting Bull on Christmas Morning
 Nightvoice
 The Ghost Dancer
 "A Dove"

See also
 1989 in poetry

References
 Hughes, Ted (1998, 2nd printing). Wolfwatching. New York: The Noonday Press.

External links
Wolf-Masks: From Hawk to Wolfwatching by Ann Skea Ph.D

English poetry collections
1989 poetry books
Poetry by Ted Hughes
Faber and Faber books